Ved Prakash Goyal (1926 – 17 December 2008) was an Indian politician and the Union Minister of shipping in the Atal Bihari Vajpayee government in India from 2001 to 2003. He was the treasurer of Bharatiya Janata Party for a long time. He was a member of Rajya Sabha, the upper house of the Parliament of India. Piyush Vedprakash Goyal, the Minister of Commerce and Industry, Consumer Affairs, Food and Public Distribution, Textiles in the Government of India is the son of Ved Prakash Goyal.

Early life 
He was born in 1926 in Karnal in British Punjab and passed B.Sc. (Engg.). He was educated at Dayanand Anglo Vedic College, Lahore and at Banaras Hindu University.

Personal life 
He died from complications of brain tumor at the Hinduja Hospital in Mumbai on 17 December 2008.

References

External links
 Seychelles.net
 Profile on Rajya Sabha website

1926 births
2008 deaths
Rajya Sabha members from Maharashtra
Bharatiya Janata Party politicians from Maharashtra
Banaras Hindu University alumni
People from Karnal
Politicians from Mumbai
Deaths from brain tumor
Deaths from cancer in India
Neurological disease deaths in India
Rajya Sabha members from the Bharatiya Janata Party